Gavarra is a station on line 5 of the Barcelona Metro.

The station is located underneath Avinguda Salvador Allende, between Carrer de l'Anoia and Carrer de l'Empordà, in Cornellà de Llobregat. It was opened in 1983.

The side-platform station has a single ticket hall with two accesses.

Services

External links
 Gavarra at Trenscat.com

Transport in Cornellà de Llobregat
Barcelona Metro line 5 stations